Runik (definite Albanian: Runiku) is a village in the Skenderaj municipality of Kosovo. It is located in the Drenica region and has 1,585 inhabitants as of 2011. The village has a football club, KF Përparimi Runik. Runik is the site of an important Neolithic settlement in Kosovo and the wider region. The excavated finds at the site include a baked-clay ocarina, one of the oldest musical instruments which have been in the Balkans and the oldest in Kosovo.

History 

The site, one of the most prominent Neolithic sites in Kosovo to date, contains artefacts from the Starcevo, Cardial and Vinca cultures. As of 2020, the two oldest sites of Starcevo are Crkvina near Miokovci, Serbia and Runik, Kosovo which are statistically indistinguishable to each other and have been dated to ca. 6238 BCE (6362-6098 BCE at 95% CI) and ca. 6185 BCE (6325–6088 BCE at 95% Cl) respectively.

It was excavated in 1966-68 and in 1984. Research was conducted in about 35 private parcels in the Dardania neighborhood of Runik. Starcevo and Vinca pottery fragments dating to 6500-3500 BC have been found at the site. A  magnetic survey was conducted at the site in March 2010, and the remains of huts reinforced with wooden joists have been found. Monochrome pottery decorated with red gloss, Cardium pottery, barbotine earthenware and ceramic pottery painted with linear and geometric designs have been found, along with anthropomorphic figurines and cult tables (small altars). Ornamental artifacts include a spiral baked-clay vase tinted with ocher, painted in dark colors and decorated as the palm of a hand. A significant find is a baked-clay ocarina  in length, known as the Runik Ocarina, the oldest musical instrument found in Kosovo to date.

Notes

References

Bibliography 

Populated places established in the 7th millennium BC
1966 archaeological discoveries
Villages in Skenderaj
Archaeological sites in Kosovo
Archaeology of Illyria
Illyrian Kosovo
Starčevo–Körös–Criș culture